Tracks is the debut studio album by Liverpool Express, released in June 1976 (UK). It features two of the band's most memorable songs, "You Are My Love" and "Every Man Must Have a Dream", both of which were Top 10 hits in Europe and South America, and Top 20 hits in the UK. Other notable hit singles were "Hold Tight" and "Smile".

The album was released on CD for the first time in 2017, along with Dreamin' and L.E.X.. Each CD was presented in a boxset with a booklet detailing the band's history and discography.

Track listing

Side one
"Smile" (Roger Scott Craig, Billy Kinsley)
"Hold Tight" (Roger Scott Craig, Billy Kinsley)
"Never the Same Without Love" (Roger Scott Craig, Billy Kinsley)
"You Are My Love" (Roger Scott Craig, Billy Kinsley)
"She's a Lady" (Roger Scott Craig, Billy Kinsley, Tony Coates)
"Call Me Your Love" (Roger Scott Craig, Billy Kinsley)

Side two
"It's a Beautiful Day" (Roger Scott Craig, Billy Kinsley)
"(I Remember) Julian the Hooligan" (Roger Scott Craig, Billy Kinsley, Tony Coates)
"Rosemary" (Roger Scott Craig, Billy Kinsley)
"Doing It All Again" (Roger Scott Craig, Billy Kinsley)
"I'll Never Fall in Love Again" (Roger Scott Craig, Billy Kinsley)
"Every Man Must Have a Dream" (Roger Scott Craig, Billy Kinsley, Tony Coates)

Personnel
Liverpool Express
Billy Kinsley – lead, harmony and backing vocals, bass guitar, acoustic guitar
Tony Coates – lead, harmony, and backing vocals, rhythm guitar, lead, acoustic guitar
Roger Scott Craig – lead, harmony and backing vocals, piano
Derek Cashin – lead, harmony and backing vocals, drums

References

External links
Official website

Liverpool Express albums
1976 debut albums
Warner Records albums